This page provides summaries to the 2002 COSAFA Cup.

First round
Winners of the first round advanced to the quarter-finals.

Quarter-finals
The four semi-finalists of the 2001 edition Angola (holders), Zimbabwe, Zambia and Malawi received byes to the quarter-finals.

Semi-finals

Final

External links
 Details at RSSSF archives

COSAFA Cup
COSAFA Cup